Tangaur (Düñgäwer) is a rural locality (a village) in Isimovsky Selsoviet, Kugarchinsky District, Bashkortostan, Russia. The population was 6 as of 2010. There is 1 street.

Geography 
Tangaur is located 47 km southwest of Mrakovo (the district's administrative centre) by road. Verkhnesanzyapovo is the nearest rural locality.

References 

Rural localities in Kugarchinsky District